In the Bible, Melchizedek ("king of righteousness" or "my king is righteousness"), also transliterated Melchisedech or Malki Tzedek, was the king of Salem and priest of  (often translated as "most high God"). He is first mentioned in Genesis 14:18–20, where he brings out bread and wine and then blesses Abram and El Elyon.

In Christianity, according to the Epistle to the Hebrews, Jesus Christ is identified as "High priest forever in the order of Melchizedek", and so Jesus assumes the role of High Priest once and for all. Chazalic literature – specifically Targum Jonathan, Targum Yerushalmi, and the Babylonian Talmud – presents his name ) as a nickname for Shem.

Joseph Blenkinsopp has suggested that the story of Melchizedek is an informal insertion into the Genesis narration, possibly inserted in order to give validity to the priesthood and tithes connected with the Second Temple. It has also been conjectured that the suffix Zedek may have been or become a reference to a Canaanite deity worshipped in pre-Israelite Jerusalem. An Ugaritic reference older than 12th century BCE to a god named  ("righteousness") has also been found, a possible forerunner of Sydyk being included in personal names.

Name
In the majority of Masoretic Hebrew texts the name is written as two words, rendered in one word in both the Septuagint and Vulgate. The Authorised King James Version of 1611 renders the name "Melchizedek" when translating from the Hebrew, and "Melchisedec" in the New Testament.

With the addition of the  compaginis indicating the archaic construct form,  means "king of", so that the name literally translates to "king of righteousness" or "my king is Zedek", indicating that he worshipped Zedek, a Canaanite deity worshipped in pre-Israelite Jerusalem. The latter, however, is often dismissed, although Robert R. Cargill has recently argued in favour of that etymology. Mainstream scholarly understanding of these names ("My King is Righteousness" and "My Lord is Righteousness" respectively) is that they refer to the concept of righteousness and not to a god.

Parallel theophoric names, with Sedeq replaced by Yahu, are those of Malchijah and Adonijah, both biblical characters placed in the time of David.

Hebrew Bible

Genesis 14
The narrative of Genesis 14 is part of the larger story telling how Abram returns from defeating king Chedorlaomer and meets with Bera the king of Sodom, at which point:

Some textual critics classify the narration as not being derived from any of the usual pentateuchal sources. It has been speculated that verses 18–20 (in which Melchizedek appears) are an informal insertion into the narration, as they interrupt the account of the meeting of Abraham with the king of Sodom. There is no consensus on when or why the story might have been added. It may have been inserted in order to give validity to the priesthood and tithes connected with the Second Temple. It also may have been inserted to give validity to the superiority of the Zadokite priests over the Levite priests.

Genesis 14:18 introduces Melchizedek a "Priest of the Most High God", a term which is re-used in Genesis 14:19–20 and Genesis 14:22. The term "Most High" is used another twenty times to refer to the God of Israel in the Psalms. Giorgio Levi Della Vida (1944) suspects that this is a late development, and Joseph Fitzmyer (1962) connects Genesis 14 with the mention of a god called "Most High," who may appear according to one of three possible translations of a 750 BC inscription found at Al-Safirah in Syria. Remi Lack (1962) considers that the Genesis verses were taken over by Jewish redactor(s), for whom El was already identified with YHWH, El-Elyon became an epithet for the God of Israel.

Tithe recipient
Due to an ambiguity in the Hebrew text, it is unclear who gave tithe to whom: Abram to Melchizedek, or Melchizedek to Abram: the verse in question  states simply, "And [he] gave him tithe from all". Most translations of this verse preserve the ambiguity, "he gave to him", but some modern translations make explicit the mainstream interpretation of Abram being the giver and Melchizedek the recipient.

Targum Pseudo-Jonathan, the Book of Jubilees, Josephus, Philo of Alexandria, and Rashi all read Abram as the giver of the tithe to Melchizedek. 
The Rogatchover Gaon, also understanding Abram to be the tithe giver, comments that the presented tithe was not a standard tithe (Maaser Rishon) as described in the Torah (given on an annual basis), but was a one-time "tribute offering", such as Moses gave to God in Numbers 31:41.

Expressing a kabbalistic point of view, the Zohar commentary to Genesis 14 cites Rabbi Yitzchak as saying that it was God who gave a tithe to Abram in the form of removing the Hebrew letter  from his own throne of glory and presenting it to the soul of Abram for his benefit.

Rabbi Meir Simcha of Dvinsk (1843–1926) interprets the phrase "And he gave him tithe from all" as a verbal continuation of Melchizedek's speech, i.e., Melchizedek exclaimed that God had chosen to gift Abram a tenth of God's possession of the entire human race (consisting of seventy nations as described in Genesis) in the form of the seven nations of the land of Canaan, including the cities of Sodom that Abram succeeded in saving. Rabbi Meir Simcha argues that continued speech of this sort was a common form of prophetic expression.

Psalm 110

The second and final Hebrew Bible mention of Melchizedek is in Psalm 110:4. The many translations that follow the Septuagint translate it as:

Although the above is the traditional translation of the text, the Hebrew text can be interpreted in various ways, and the New Jewish Publication Society of America Tanakh, (1985 edition), for example, has:

Another alternative keeps Melchizedek as a personal name but changes the identity of the person addressed: "You are a priest forever by my order (or 'on my account'), O Melchizedek" – here it is Melchizedek who is being addressed throughout the psalm.

The majority of Chazalic literature attributes the primary character of the psalm as King David who was a "righteous king" of Salem and, like Melchizedek, had certain priest-like responsibilities, while the Babylonian Talmud understands the chapter as referring to Abram who was victorious in battling to save his nephew Lot and merited priesthood. The Zohar defines the noted Melchizedek as referring to Ahron the Kohen Gadol (high priest).

Samaritan Pentateuch
The Samaritan Pentateuch reads  ( or in contextual flow "allied with him") in place of the Masoretic  (Salem), with addition of a letter .

William F. Albright views the Samaritan wording as authentic as does the New American Bible

Regarding the residence of Malkizedek, Samaritan tradition identified a "Salem" as a place on the slopes of Mount Gerizim which served as a blessing place of the children of Israel upon their initial crossing of the Jordan river. The Samaritans allocate Gerizim (and not Jerusalem) as the site intended for the Temple, and thus the  text serves an obvious sectarian purpose. However, this practice is not solely associated with the Samaritans: the possessive suffix is also found in the 3rd- or 2nd-century BC Book of Jubilees, and Greek possessive suffixes are even used in the Septuagint version of Genesis.

New Testament

With respect to Genesis 14:20, Hebrews chapter 7 verses 2 and 4 in the New Testament state that the patriarch Abraham gave a tenth of the spoil to Melchizedek.

Psalm 110:4 is cited in the New Testament letter to the Hebrews as an indicator that Jesus, regarded in the letter as the Messiah, had a right to a priesthood pre-dating the Jewish Aaronic priesthood (Hebrews 5:5–6).

In Judaism

Hellenistic Judaism
Josephus refers to Melchizedek as a "Canaanite chief" in War of the Jews, but as a priest in Antiquities of the Jews.

Philo identifies Melchizedek with the Logos as priest of God, and honoured as an untutored priesthood.

The Second Book of Enoch (also called "Slavonic Enoch") is apparently a Jewish sectarian work of the 1st century AD. The last section of the work, the Exaltation of Melchizedek, tells how Melchizedek was born of a virgin, Sofonim (or Sopanima), the wife of Nir, a brother of Noah. The child came out from his mother after she had died and sat on the bed beside her corpse, already physically developed, clothed, speaking and blessing the Lord, and marked with the badge of priesthood. Forty days later, Melchizedek was taken by the archangel Gabriel (Michael in some manuscripts) to the Garden of Eden and was thus preserved from the Deluge without having to be in Noah's Ark.

The Story of Melchizedek is a short pseudepigraphon composed in Greek in the first three centuries AD, probably in a Jewish milieu. It survives today only in Christian recensions, but in at least ten languages.

Dead Sea Scrolls
11Q13 (11QMelch) is a fragment of a text, dated to the end of the second or start of the first century BC, about Melchizedek, found in Cave 11 at Qumran in the West Bank and part of the Dead Sea Scrolls. Melchizedek is seen as a divine being in the text and is referred to as "El" or "Elohim", titles usually reserved for God. According to the text, Melchizedek will proclaim the "Day of Atonement" and he will atone for the people who are predestined to him. He also will judge the peoples.

The Genesis Apocryphon (1QapGen) repeats information from Genesis.

The Qumran Scrolls, also indicate that Melchizedek was used as a name of the Archangel Michael, interpreted as a heavenly priest; Michael as  contrast with Belial, who is given the name of  "king of wickedness". The text of the Epistle to the Hebrews follows this interpretation in stating explicitly that the name in Greek translation means  ("king of righteousness"), omitting translation of the possessive suffix; the same passage interprets Melchizedek's title of king of Salem as translating to  "king of peace", the context being the presentation of Melchizedek's as an eternal priesthood associated with Jesus Christ ("made like unto the Son of God abideth a priest continually").

Torah commentaries
Hebrew-language Torah commentarians of the Rishonim era (11th to 15th centuries) have explained the (seemingly) abrupt intrusion of Melchizedek into the narration in various ways; Hezekiah ben Manoah points out that the following verses have Abraham refusing any of the king of Sodom's possessions which, if not for the insertion of Melchizedek's hospitality, would prompt the query as to where Abraham and his weary men got their refreshments from. The Rashbam, Shmuel ben Meir (11th century), offers a similar explanation but varies by saying that only Abram's men partook in the booty (originally belonging to the king of Sodom) whereas the Melchizedek intrusion explains that Abram himself was sustained by Melchizedek since he refused to consume of the luxury of Sodom because his Lord was of the non-material world. Likewise, the commentary of Chaim ibn Attar (17th century) offers a three-pronged slew of reasons for the Melchizedek insertion.

In rabbinic literature
The narrative preceding Melchizedek's introduction presents a picture of Melchizedek's involvement in the events of his era. The narration details Abram's rescue of his nephew Lot and his spectacular defeat of multiple kings, and goes on to define the meeting place of Melchizedek and Abram as " which is ". Targum Onkelos describes the meeting location's size as "a plot the size of a king's ". Midrashic exegesis describes how a large group of governors and kings convened in unison to pay homage to the victor Abram and desired to make him a deity, at which point he declined, attributing his victory to God's might and will alone.

The chronological work  (published 1769) quotes that Melchizedek was the first to initiate and complete a wall in circumference of the city, and had to exit Salem to reach Abram and his men. Upon exiting Salem, he presented to them "bread and wine" with the intent to refresh them from their journey. Assuming the premise that Melchizedek was Shem, he would have been 465 years old at the time and Abram was 75 years of age.

Chazalic literature unanimously identify Melchizedek as Shem son of Noah (Targum Yonathan to Genesis chapter 14, Genesis Rabbah 46:7, Babylonian Talmud to Tractate Nedarim 32b). The Talmud Bavli attributes him (Shem and his beth din court of justice) as pioneers in banning prostitution (Avodah Zarah p.36a).

There is, however, disagreement amongst Rishonim as to whether Salem was Melchizedek/Shem's allocated residence by his father Noah or whether he was a foreigner in Salem which was considered the rightful land of his brother Cham. However, Rashi maintains that the land of Canaan was initially allotted to Shem, by Noah his father, and the offspring of Cham conquered the land by forced expansion.

Transition of the Priesthood

Although Melchizedek is the first person in the Torah to be titled a Kohen (priest), the medrash records that he was preceded in priesthood (kehuna) by Adam.

Leviticus Rabbah maintains that God intended to  bring forth the priesthood through Melchizedek's patrilineal descendants, but since Melchizedek  Abram's blessing to that of God, God instead chose to bring the priesthood forth from Abram's descendants. As the text states in regard to Melchizedek; "and he is a Kohen" meaning himself in the exclusive sense and not his patrilineal descendants.

The Ohr HaChayim commentary presents that God was not angered by Melchizedek's preceding Abram's blessing to that of God, since Abram was rightfully deemed worthy of precedence for independently coming to recognize God amidst a world of Paganism, but Melchizedek  gave the priesthood to Abram upon recognizing his outstanding uniqueness and godly character traits.

Rabbinic authorities differ as to whether Kehuna was given to Abram there and then or after the demise of Melchizedek.

Midrash text
The Midrash quotes multiple aspects of both Melchizedek and Abram; the Rabbis taught that Melchizedek acted as a priest and handed down Adam's robes to Abram (Numbers Rabbah 4:8).

Rabbi Isaac the Babylonian said that Melchizedek was born circumcised (Genesis Rabbah 43:6). Melchizedek called Jerusalem "Salem." (Genesis Rabbah 56:10.) The Rabbis said that Melchizedek instructed Abram in the Torah. (Genesis Rabbah 43:6.) Rabbi Eleazar said that Melchizedek's school was one of three places where the Holy Spirit manifested himself (Babylonian Talmud Makkot 23b).

Rabbi Judah said in Rabbi Nehorai's name that Melchizedek's blessing yielded prosperity for Abram, Isaac, and Jacob (Genesis Rabbah 43:8). Ephraim Miksha'ah the disciple of Rabbi Meir said in the latter's name that Tamar descended from Melchizedek (Genesis Rabbah 85:10).

Rabbi Hana bar Bizna citing Rabbi Simeon Hasida identified Melchizedek as one of the four craftsmen of whom Zechariah wrote in Zechariah 2:3. (Babylonian Talmud Sukkah 52b; see also Song of Songs Rabbah 2:33 (crediting Rabbi Berekiah in the name of Rabbi Isaac).) The Talmud teaches that David wrote the Book of Psalms, including in it the work of the elders, including Melchizedek.

Thus according to Jewish legend, confusion over Melchizedek being both King and Priest is solved by knowing that Shem was also a progenitor of the Davidic Monarchy, which descended from both Judah and Tamar, who was sentenced to 'death by fire' when accused of committing prostitution as the daughter of high priest Shem.

In the Zohar
The Zohar (redacted by Moses de León ) finds in "Melchizedek king of Salem" a reference to "the King Who rules with complete sovereignty". or according to another explanation, that "Melchizedek" alludes to the lower world and "king of Salem" to the upper world  (Zohar 1:86b–87a). The Zohar's commentary on Genesis 14 cites a Rabbi Yitzchak as saying that it was God who gave tithe to Abram in the form of removing the Hebrew letter  from his throne of glory and presenting it to the soul of Abram for his benefit. The letter  is the letter God added to Abram's name to become "Abra-ha-m" in Genesis.

In Christianity

In the New Testament, references to Melchizedek appear only in the Epistle to the Hebrews, though these are extensive (Hebrews 5:6, 10; 6:20; 7:1, 10, 11, 15, 17, 21). Jesus Christ is there identified as "a priest forever in the order of Melchizedek", quoting from Psalm 110:4.

Association with the Messiah
The association or identification of Melchizedek with the Messiah predates Christianity, developing in Jewish messianism of the Second Temple period.

A collection of early Gnostic scripts dating on or before the 4th century, discovered in 1945 and known as the Nag Hammadi library, contains a tractate pertaining to Melchizedek. Here it is proposed that Melchizedek  Jesus Christ. Melchizedek, as Jesus Christ, lives, preaches, dies and is resurrected, in a gnostic perspective. The Coming of the Son of God Melchizedek speaks of his return to bring peace, supported by God, and he is a priest-king who dispenses justice.

The association with Christ is made explicit by the author of the Epistle to the Hebrews, where Melchizedek the "king of righteousness" and "king of peace" is explicitly associated with the "eternal priesthood" of the Son of God.Willard M. Swartley, Covenant of Peace, Wm. B. Eerdmans Publishing, 2006, p. 255. The Christological interpretation of this Old Testament character being a prefiguration or prototype of the Christ has varied between Christian denominations. The Pelagians saw in Melchizedek merely a man who lived a perfect life.

Typological association of Jesus Christ with Old Testament characters occurs frequently in the New Testament and in later Christian writings; thus, Jesus Christ is also associated with Adam (as the "New Adam") and with Abraham. The bread and wine offering of Melchizedek has been interpreted by church fathers including Clement of Alexandria as being a prefiguration of the Eucharist.

Liturgical commemoration
Melchizedek is mentioned in the Roman Canon, the First Eucharistic Prayer of the Roman rite of the Catholic Church, and also figures in the current Roman Martyrology as a commemoration on August 26.

He is commemorated in the Eastern Orthodox Church on May 22, and on the "Sunday of the Forefathers" (two Sundays before Christmas). In the Calendar of Saints of the Armenian Apostolic Church Melkisetek is commemorated as one of the Holy Forefathers on July 26.

Protestantism
Traditional Protestant Christian denominations, following Luther, teach that Melchizedek was a historical figure and an archetype of Christ.

Tremper Longman III notes that a popular understanding of the relationship between Melchizedek and Jesus is that Melchizedek is an Old Testament Christophany – in other words, that Melchizedek  Jesus.

Latter Day Saint movement
In the Latter Day Saint movement, the Book of Mormon makes reference to Melchizedek in (Alma 13:17–19). According to Encyclopædia Britannica, Joseph Smith "appointed his male followers to priesthoods, named for the biblical figures Melchizedek and Aaron, that were overseen by the office of High Priest", incorporating selected practices from the Hebrew Bible. These priesthoods are laid out by Smith in Doctrine and Covenants 107:1-2, 4, 6-10, 14, 17-18, 22, 29, 71, 73, 76, as well as more than twenty additional references in that work.

In Islam
Although Melchizedek is not referred to in the Quran, some have identified him with the figure known as the Khidr. In Isma'ilism, Melchizedek (known as Malik as-Salām) is believed to have been the one to initiate Abraham into prophethood. An Ismaili treatise dated to the 1300s proclaimed that Melchizedek would return following the resurrection as a righteous judge and reveal the divine mysteries which the prophets have kept secret throughout the centuries.

 In modern culture 
Melchizedek appears as a character in Paulo Coelho's novel The Alchemist, where he guides the protagonist, Santiago. In Dickens' novel Dombey and Son, a minor character, Mrs. MacStinger, attends an evangelical church presided over by the Reverend Melchisedech Howler. Two novels later, in Bleak House'', Dickens' lawyer character, Mr. Tulkinghorn, initially tells a debtor that he does not do bill extensions in his practice, so, "You must go to Melchisedech's in Clifford's Inn."

See also
 Amraphel
 Arioch
 Dominion of Melchizedek
 Lech-Lecha
 Melchisedechians
 Righteous Priest
 Zadok

Notes

References

Further reading

External links 

 

 
Ancient history of Jerusalem
Book of Genesis people
Christian saints from the Old Testament
Epistle to the Hebrews
Lech-Lecha
Monarchs of the Hebrew Bible
People from Jerusalem
Shem
Torah monarchs
Abraham